Percy John de Paravicini  (15 July 1862 – 11 October 1921) was an English amateur cricketer and international footballer in the late nineteenth century.

Early life and education
He was born in Kensington, London, the son of Baron James Prior de Paravicini, of Riverside, Datchet, Windsor. He was educated at Aldin House, Slough and Eton College, where he was a member of the cricket eleven from 1878 to 1881, being captain in 1880 and 1881.

Cricket career
De Paravicini was one of an elite few to have played for the Eton College cricket XI for four consecutive years, and arguably he was one of the best players the school has had. He was captain in 1880 and 1881 (i.e. Keeper of the Field). He played against his brother, Harry, in the annual Eton v Harrow cricket match held at Lord's Cricket Ground.

He made his first-class debut for Middlesex on 15 August 1881 at Old Trafford, Manchester in the County Tournament against Lancashire. He continued to appear for Middlesex throughout August, playing in four county matches, scoring only 33 runs and taking one wicket. He was a right-handed middle-order batsman, a slow round-arm bowler and an outstanding fielder.

In the autumn of 1881 he went up to Trinity College, Cambridge where he won a cricket blue in each of his four years (1882 to 1885). He played his first cricket match for the University on 25 May 1882 against the "Gentlemen of England". In 1882 he appeared six times for Cambridge University.

1883 was his best season, making 17 appearances (7 for the University, 8 for Middlesex and 2 for representative teams) scoring 595 runs at an average of 24.79 and taking 16 wickets at an average of 20.75. In the match at The Oval for the University against Surrey in June he made his best score to date with 61 in the first innings and taking 4 wickets for 26 runs. In this match Charles Studd made his best ever score with 175 n.o. as the University won the match by 200 runs.

In 1888 he improved his best batting performance, with 77 for Middlesex against Nottinghamshire in June; he scored a total of 485 in the season at an average of 14.69.

During his first-class career he played 62 times for Middlesex and 25 for Cambridge University. He also played for Buckinghamshire from 1899 to 1911.

Football career

At Cambridge University he won his blue for football in 1883. A "speedy, two-footed defender", he appeared in two FA Cup Finals for Old Etonians, being on the winning side in 1882 against Blackburn Rovers, but losing out the following year to Blackburn Olympic.

In the 1882 final, he was part of the last "all amateur" side to win the FA Cup as well as the last team from south of Birmingham to win it during the nineteenth century. The Old Etonians fielded a team with nine players with previous FA Cup final experience, having reached the final four times in the previous seven seasons. In the match itself, de Paravicini and Arthur Kinnaird managed to contain the Blackburn Rovers forwards, whilst the Old Boys' forwards continually created problems for the Rovers' defence until Reginald Macaulay managed to steer the ball between the Blackburn goalposts for the only goal of the game.

In February and March 1883 he was selected for all three England internationals, against Scotland, Wales and Ireland. England comfortably defeated the Welsh 5–0 (with a hat trick from Clement Mitchell) and the Irish 7–0, but lost out to the Scots by the odd goal in five.

On 31 March 1883, the Old Etonians reached the FA Cup final for the third consecutive year and were comfortable favourites to defeat Blackburn Olympic. Olympic however were well organised and defeated the Old Boys 2–1 after extra time.

After his exploits in the FA Cup and for England, de Paravicini made occasional appearances for the Corinthians. He also played for Windsor football club and made representative appearances for London, Berkshire and Buckinghamshire, and The South versus The North.

Honours
Old Etonians
FA Cup winner: 1882
FA Cup finalist: 1883

Life outside sport
At Eton he was a president of 'Pop'; the group of 25 elected prefects.

He was a J.P. for Buckinghamshire and during the First World War took command of the Datchet Volunteer Platoon. He was decorated with the Commander, Royal Victorian Order (C.V.O.).

He is also credited with being on the inaugural committee for Stoke Park Club based in Stoke Poges, and the only member of the Corinthians on the committee at the time.

Family and death
On 21 May 1891, he married Lady Marcia Charlotte Maria Cholmondeley, daughter of Charles George, the Viscount Malpas. His brother, Harry Farquhar de Paravicini, married Lady Marcia's sister, Lady Eva Harriet Cholmondeley.

They lived in the family home at Riverside, Datchet and had three sons. He died on 11 October 1921 at Hill Fields, Pangbourne, Berkshire, England aged 59 following an operation. His obituary in Wisden stated: "Few men personally more popular have ever been seen in the cricket field. His career was in one respect peculiar. He was in proportion a far greater force in his school days than he ever became in first-class matches."

References

External links

Profile at www.englandfc.com

1862 births
Footballers from Kensington
Cricketers from Greater London
1921 deaths
People educated at Eton College
English people of Italian descent
Alumni of Trinity College, Cambridge
England international footballers
English footballers
Old Etonians F.C. players
Cambridge University A.F.C. players
Corinthian F.C. players
English cricketers
Cambridge University cricketers
Middlesex cricketers
Buckinghamshire cricketers
Commanders of the Royal Victorian Order
I Zingari cricketers
Buckinghamshire cricket captains
Gentlemen cricketers
Marylebone Cricket Club cricketers
Gentlemen of England cricketers
Association football defenders
C. I. Thornton's XI cricketers
A. J. Webbe's XI cricketers
North v South cricketers
FA Cup Final players